Sunitha Sarathy  is an Indian vocalist and performer in both Indian contemporary and Western classical music genres. She is also a gospel singer who performs in various church choirs. After having won the "Virgin Voice Choice" contest – a joint initiative of Channel V and Virgin Records in the year 2000, Sarathy debuted into film playback in the year 2002.

She debuted as a playback singer with the Tamil film Yei! Nee Romba Azhagey Irruke guest-singing the prelude and interlude portions of the song "Ini Naanum Naanillai" with Srinivas and Sujatha Mohan as the lead singers. Sarathy has around 200 film songs in various languages, performances as singer-keyboardist-percussionist across a wide spectrum of Western music genres including classical, jazz, soul and R&B, neo-soul and quiet storm, and a prolific output of gospel songs to her credit.

Early life
Coming from a family well-versed in Western music (classical jazz), Sarathy started singing in choirs from a young age of four. Her mother Susheela Sarathy is a pianist and conductor of leading Madras choirs at Santhome Church and Lazarus Church. Sunitha's irrepressible talent conquered all, including her initial flippancy. Her performances at Santhome – including devotionals in Latin and Franz Schubert's Ave Maria – elevated her to star status among Madras' church music circles. She has had the honour of rendering the 'Easter Proclamation' – a typical Catholic chant – for three years before an overflowing San Thome Basilica.

In 2000, Sarathy won the Virgin Voice Choice contest – a joint initiative of Channel V and Virgin Records. Out of 45,000 entries, 1,500 contestants were shortlisted. Ten made it to the finals in Mumbai, of which Sarathy emerged as a winner.

Career
Sunitha Sarathy was noticed by playback singer Srinivas after her victory in the talent hunt program. He offered her a small portion of a song which he was guest-composing for the film Hey! Nee Romba Azhaga Irukke in the year 2002. Soon later, composer Harris Jayaraj recorded her voice for a Love theme and dance theme in his Telugu film Vasu. However she got a big break and wider recognition after singing the full-length solo song "Thoodu Varuma" for the blockbuster Tamil film, Kaakha Kaakha in the same year.

Sarathy got a national recognition for her playback singing for a Hindi – Tamil bilingual film Yuva / Aaytha Ezhuthu in 2004 both directed by Mani Ratnam with music composition by A. R. Rahman. Soon after this, Sarathy recorded her voice for many successful soundtracks in various languages. Some of her notable works are for the films that include Mitr, My Friend, Anniyan, Polladhavan, Vallavan, Kana Kandaen,  Don 2, Happy Days, Sainikudu, Cheluvina Chittara among others. She also recorded the song "Warriors in peace" for the Mandarin film Warriors of Heaven and Earth composed by A. R. Rahman.

Sarathy performed for a song at the 2006 Asian Games.

In July 2013, Sunitha Sarathy became the first solo female performer from India to be signed by AKG microphones as an endorsee

July 2014 saw the launch of Sunitha Sarathy's School of Vocal Excellence, a performance oriented learning center for aspiring singers.

Notable filmography

References

External links
 

Living people
Indian women playback singers
Malayalam playback singers
Tamil playback singers
Telugu playback singers
Kannada playback singers
Bollywood playback singers
Indian gospel singers
Indian women classical singers
21st-century Indian singers
21st-century Indian women singers
Women musicians from Tamil Nadu
Singers from Chennai
Year of birth missing (living people)